The Shipping Register of Ukraine is a Classification Society, whose main activity is a shipping safety at sea and rivers.

It was established in 1998 with head office in Kyiv, Ukraine. Ten regional representatives, twenty-one survey districts and two departments represents on all the territory of Ukraine.

1998 establishments in Ukraine
Economy of Ukraine
Ship classification societies